José Gochangco (19 February 1926 – 23 January 2008) was a Filipino basketball player who competed in the 1952 Summer Olympics.

References

External links
 

1926 births
2008 deaths
Olympic basketball players of the Philippines
Basketball players at the 1952 Summer Olympics
Asian Games medalists in basketball
Basketball players at the 1951 Asian Games
Philippines men's national basketball team players
Filipino men's basketball players
Asian Games gold medalists for the Philippines
Medalists at the 1951 Asian Games